The 2006-07 season was FC Dinamo București's 58th season in Liga I. Dinamo qualified for the European Spring by beating Beşiktaş and Bayer Leverkusen 2–1 in Bucharest, drawing 1–1 at Club Brugge and losing 3–1 in London to Tottenham Hotspur. In the next round they faced Benfica, but were eliminated after a 0–1 loss at Da Luz and a 1–2 loss at home. Domestically, the team crushed most of its opponents in the first 19 rounds, ending up autumn champions, 13 points ahead of second place. After two spectacular away wins against the rivals, 4–2 with Steaua and 4–1 with Rapid, Dinamo relaxed and let some points slip in other matches. Nevertheless, they secured their 18th title with four rounds to spare.

Results

UEFA Cup 

First qualifying round

Dinamo won 9-1 on aggregate.

Second qualifying round

1Due to the armed conflict going on in Israel, UEFA decided that no European matches could be staged in the country until further notice. Beitar Jerusalem's home match was moved to Sofia, Bulgaria.

Dinamo won 2-1 on aggregate.

First round

Dinamo won 8-4 on aggregate.

Group phase

Round of 32

Benfica won 3-1 on aggregate.

Squad 

Goalkeepers: Uladzimir Hayew  (11 / 0); Bogdan Lobonț (14 / 0); Florin Matache (7 / 0); Glen Moss  (1 / 0); Deniss Romanovs  (1 / 0).
Defenders: George Blay  (31 / 0); Silviu Bălace (9 / 0); Eugen Crăciun (1 / 0); George Galamaz (1 / 0); Lucian Goian (7 / 0); Sergiu Homei (1 / 0); Dorin Mihuț (5 / 0); Cosmin Moți (29 / 1); Nicolae Mușat (2 / 0); Cosmin Pașcovici (4 / 0); Cristian Pulhac (32 / 0); Ștefan Radu (32 / 1); Adrian Scarlatache (6 / 0); Māris Smirnovs  (1 / 0).
Midfielders:  Adrian Cristea (28 / 3); Fabrice Fernandes  (5 / 0); Leo Lerinc  (1 / 0); Andrei Mărgăritescu (31 / 1); Cătălin Munteanu (32 / 4); Andrei Nițu (2 / 0); Cornel Predescu (8 / 0); Adrian Ropotan (21 / 0); Sreten Stanić  (1 / 0); Dennis Șerban (7 / 2); Iulian Tameș (15 / 0); Vojislav Vranjković  (9 / 0); Zé Kalanga  (21 / 2).
Forwards: Ionel Dănciulescu (31 / 15); Ionel Ganea (18 / 14); Liviu Ganea (9 / 2); Valentin Lemnaru (1 / 0); Jean-Philippe Mendy  (9 / 0); Claudiu Niculescu (31 / 18).
(league appearances and goals listed in brackets)

Manager: Mircea Rednic.

Transfers 

New players: Summer break – Glen Moss -New Zealand (New Zealand Knights FC), George Blay -Ghana- (RAAL La Louviere), Cosmin Paşcovici (Farul Constanţa), Lucian Goian (Ceahlăul Piatra-Neamţ), Iulian Tameş (FC Naţional), Zé Kalanga Nsimba Paulo Baptista -Angola- (Atlético Petróleos Luanda), Leo Lerinc -Serbia- (Ethnikos Achnas), Sreten Stanić -Serbia- (FCU Politehnica Timișoara), Ionel Ganea (Wolverhampton Wanderers)

Winter break – Bogdan Lobonţ (AC Fiorentina), Deniss Romanovs -Latvia- (SK Ditton Daugavpils), Maris Smirnovs -Latvia- (SK Ditton Daugavpils), Sergiu Homei (FC Sopron), Silviu Bălace (FCU Politehnica Timișoara), Vojislav Vranjković -Serbia- (Pandurii Târgu-Jiu), Fabrice Fernandes -Franţa- (Beitar Jerusalem).

Left team: Summer break – Cosmin Bărcăuan (PAOK Thessaloniki), Szabolcs Perenyi (Farul Constanţa), Daniel Florea (APOEL Nicosia), Tiberiu Curt (retired), Florentin Petre (CSKA Sofia), Dan Alexa (FCU Politehnica Timișoara), Alin Ilin (FC Naţional București), Ştefan Grigorie (FCU Politehnica Timișoara), Vlad Munteanu (FC Energie Cottbus), Ianis Zicu (Rapid București), Florin Bratu (FC Nantes-Atlantique), Claudiu Drăgan (FC Naţional București)

Winter break – Vladimir Gaev -Belarus (Chornomorets Odesa), Florin Matache (FC Vaslui), Mircea Oltean (Unirea Urziceni), George Galamaz (Unirea Urziceni), Cosmin Paşcovici (FCM UTA Arad), Lucian Goian (Ceahlăul Piatra-Neamţ), Dorin Mihuţ (FCM UTA Arad), Cornel Predescu (Gloria Bistriţa), Iulian Tameş (FC Argeş Piteşti), Dennis Şerban (free player), Dan Codreanu (Gloria Bistriţa), Mihai Damaschin (Gloria Bistriţa), Ionel Ganea (Rapid București)

References

External links 
 www.labtof.ro
 www.romaniansoccer.ro
 worldfootball.net

FC Dinamo București seasons
Dinamo Bucuresti
Romanian football championship-winning seasons